Bjarne Rognlien (28 January 1891  – ) was a Norwegian judge.

He was born in Eidanger to Bernt Martin Rognlien and Anna Randers. He graduated as cand.jur. in 1916. He was appointed as district stipendiary magistrate (sorenskriver) in Salten from 1939, and in Eiker, Modum and Sigdal from 1947 to 1961. He served as acting Supreme Court Justice from 1948 to 1949.

References

1891 births
Year of death missing
People from Porsgrunn
Norwegian judges